The Le Roitelet was a French automobile manufactured in Paris from 1921 to 1924.  A front wheel drive cyclecar, it had a twin-cylinder 749 cc engine.

References
David Burgess Wise, The New Illustrated Encyclopedia of Automobiles.

Roitelet, Le
Cyclecars